Ephrin type-B receptor 1 is a protein that in humans is encoded by the EPHB1 gene.

Function 

Ephrin receptors and their ligands, the ephrins, mediate numerous developmental processes, particularly in the nervous system. Based on their structures and sequence relationships, ephrins are divided into the ephrin-A (EFNA) class, which are anchored to the membrane by a glycosylphosphatidylinositol linkage, and the ephrin-B (EFNB) class, which are transmembrane proteins. The Eph family of receptors are divided into 2 groups based on the similarity of their extracellular domain sequences and their affinities for binding ephrin-A and ephrin-B ligands. Ephrin receptors make up the largest subgroup of the receptor tyrosine kinase (RTK) family. The protein encoded by this gene is a receptor for ephrin-B family members.

Interactions 

EPH receptor B1 has been shown to interact with:
 ACP1 
 GRB7  and
 NCK1
 Ephrin-B2

References

Further reading